The first running of the women's event of the Three Days of Bruges–De Panne was held on 22 March 2018. It started in Bruges and finished in De Panne with two  loops between De Panne and Koksijde, totaling . It was the fourth leg of the 2018 UCI Women's World Tour. Belgian Jolien D'Hoore, who was unaware she was sprinting for victory, won the race in a sprint.

Teams
Twenty-four teams entered the race. Each team had a maximum of six riders:

Result

References

Three Days of Bruges–De Panne
Three Days of Bruges–De Panne
Three Days of Bruges–De Panne
Three Days of Bruges–De Panne (women's race)